Imtihaan is an Indian television series broadcast on DD National in 1995. The show was produced by Anupam Kher and later episodes were directed by a then novice Imtiaz Ali.

Title song of the show - Aankhon mein rok le, tu ye aasuon ka toofan. Leti hai zindgaani, har kadam pe ek Imtihaan was very popular. This song was sung by Abhijeet and composed by Ajit Varman.

The cast included well-known actors such as Alok Nath, Renuka Shahane, Anang Desai, Raju Kher, Firdaus Dadi, Ninad Kamat, Sachin Khedekar, Manoj Bajpayee and others. Character played by Renuka Shahane was later replaced by Pallavi Joshi.

Cast
Alok Nath
Renuka Shahane
Anang Desai
Raju Kher
Firdaus Dadi
Ninad Kamat
Sachin Khedekar
Manoj Bajpayee

References

External links 
 Listen to Imtihaan title song on YouTube
 

1995 Indian television series debuts
DD National original programming
Indian drama television series